Serhiy Bubka College of Olympic Reserve is a sports college in Donetsk. Due to the 2014 Russian invasion of Ukraine, the college relocated to Bakhmut.

Brief description
The college was established on !8 August 1989 on the basis of the Donetsk Tekhnikum of Physical Culture.

In 1995 the college was named after Ukrainian pole jumper and the president of the National Olympic Committee of Ukraine, Serhiy Bubka.

Notable alumni
 Lilia Podkopaeva
 Yaroslav Rakitskyi
 Serhiy Rebrov
 Oleksandr Filippov

See also
 National University of Physical Education and Sport of Ukraine
 FC Olimpik Donetsk

References

External links
 Official website

 
Universities and colleges in Donetsk
Sport schools in Ukraine